The 2004 Jalna Mosque bomb attack comprises two separate crude bomb attacks at local mosques in Jalna, Maharashtra on 27 August 2004. According to senior police officer, the first blast occurred at Kadriya Masjid in Jalna at 1:45 pm and the second explosion occurred barely 15 minutes later at another mosque on the outskirts of Poorna town in Parbhani district. The attacks were carried out during Friday prayer and total 18 people were injured. Later on 18 July 2012 all seven accused were acquitted in the case due to lack of evidence by a district and sessions court.

References 

Attacks in India in 2004
Attacks on mosques in Asia
Crime in Maharashtra
2004 crimes in India
Religiously motivated violence in India
Anti-Muslim violence in India
August 2004 events in India
Attacks on religious buildings and structures in India
Building bombings in India